Pon Manickavel is a 2021 Indian Tamil-language action thriller film directed by A. C. Mugil Chellappan of Kandaen fame. The film stars Prabhu Deva and Nivetha Pethuraj in lead roles. Music is scored by D. Imman. It is the 50th film of Prabhu Deva. The film was released on 19 November 2021. The film also marks the final film appearance of actor and director Mahendran, before his death on 2 April 2019. The film received mixed reviews from critics.

Plot 

A beheaded body of a judge is found at the entrance of his residence. The Police department heads the investigation with officer Peruvalathan. There are 4 gun shot wounds but no bullets found. The DCP suggests, ACP Pon Manickavel to assist them, for him being a gun specialist. Manik has resigned from his job after one of his cases in Salem. He joins the team with a rather dull and non-serious investigation, which is hated by Peruvalathan. But soon he understands Manik. Manik concludes that the next target for the killer is an Inspector. The inspector gets a threatening message from an unknown number and requests Manik's help. But the car the Inspector was in blasts right in front of Manik and Peruvalathan. They trace an IP address and reach the residence of an Undercover officer Kailash.

Kailash provides a photograph of the Judge and Inspector with a business tycoon Arjun K Maran. Arjun is immediately given police protection when the assassin arrives, trying to kill him. Manik also becomes close and a personal bodyguard for Arjun, by telling him about his past case in Salem, which ended up in a jail term and him resigning his job. Manik fails to convict a criminal, Sait, who raped and murdered a girl. Seeing the man out, the girl's mother shoots herself with Manik's gun. Manik is sent to 6 months in prison. Arjun provides Manik with 10 Crores as requested, and gaining his trust. Kailash discovers that the killer is an old man, named Nasarathulla. Nasarathulla's granddaughter was harassed via message by Arjun and when she filed a complain, Arjun was arrested. But he claimed that the phone was stolen and released. Nasarathulla then finds his granddaughter kidnapped by some men while he was on video call with her and the police didn't help. She was then found dead in a train accident. Nasarthulla was then caught by police, trying to buy an illegal gun.

Having the man's image through CCTV, Manik sends it to Arjun, who says it was an old business issue. He is then given protection in the Commissioner Office but is attempted to be killed. Manik saves him, gaining his trust more. Once, trying to evade Arjun's assassination, Manik is stabbed. In the hospital, the Commissioner tells the higher official that they are watching Arjun's movements without him knowing as they suspect his actions of having a 4th person in the case, who might either be behind this or the next target. The attempt at his house and Commissioner office were set up by Manik, but the last attack was real. Manik the finds out from a CCTV ad footage of the man who stabbed him and finds his name as Aaron. Aaron the tries to kill Manik's wife Anbu but Manik kills him in an abandoned building. Manik then requests Arjun to reveal the truth.

Arjun reveals the name Badrinath as a bug suspect. Michael is a bigger businessman than Arjun, who is a womaniser. Nasarathulla's granddaughter Heena, was one of his womans. Arjun, the judge and the inspector also raped her, before handing her over to Michael. Arjun reveals that Heena is still captive in Michael's villa. Manickavel rescues her and keeps her safe at his house. Michael receives a threatening message and is given protection as well, this time headed by DCP Thilak. But Michael is also targeted at his house and flees to his guesthouse, and stays in an underground bunker.

Amidst these, Kailash tries to track down the unknown gun used to kill the Judge. It narrows down to Manik, of still using the special gun provided by Delhi Armory. Indeed, it was Manik, who had been faking all these, from protecting Arjun to protecting Michael.Michael is then killed by Manik in his bunker, after causing a distraction in the garden. Manik and Nasarathulla were in the same cell in prison and Nasarathulla has told him everything. Manik, often finishes off criminals who have evaded jail term due to influence. The Sait from his Salem encounter was also killed by Manik. As Manik shoot Badri, the police arrives and Manik tells them that the old man shot Michael and turned the gun on him so he had to shoot in self-defence. The commissioner praises him.

It is then revealed that Nasarthulla is safe with him. Arjun was killed by Nasarathulla and Manik killed the judge and the inspector. Kailash, without informing anyone and personally to Manik, vows to arrest him one day to which Manik wishes him luck.

Cast 

 Prabhu Deva as ACP Pon Manickavel IPS
 Nivetha Pethuraj as Anbarasi Manickavel
 Sudhanshu Pandey as Badrinath
 Suresh Chandra Menon as Arjun K. Maran
 Mahendran as Nasrathullah
 Mukesh Tiwari as Motilal Seth
 Prabhakar as Inspector Peruvalathan 
 Charles Vinoth as Inspector Kailash
 96 Gowthamraj as school student
 Athira Patel as Dhanya
 Vincent Asokan as ACP Thilak
 Uday Mahesh as DCP Moorthy
 Vignesh Vijayan as Sub Inspector Nandhakumar
 Bijesh Nagesh as Constable Gopal
 Deepa Shankar as victim's mother
 Priyadarshini Rajkumar as Home Minister
 Kavitha Bharathy as Inspector Rathnavel

Production 
The first look poster of Pon Manickavel shows Prabhu Deva as a police officer, and for the first time, he is acting as a police officer in his filmography. For the first time, D. Imman is composing music with Prabhu Deva in his film.

Soundtrack 

The film's score and songs were composed by D. Imman and lyrics by Madhan Karky, Viveka, GKB and Ranjan.

Release 
The filmmakers initially announced that the film would be released worldwide on 21 February 2020, then later pushed to a 6 March 2020 release. The film was further postponed due to the COVID-19 pandemic. In July 2021, it was announced that the theatrical release was cancelled, and that the film would instead stream via Disney+ Hotstar. The film was released on 19 November 2021.

Reception
The film received Mixed reviews from critics and  positive reviews from audience.

References

External links 
 

2021 films
2021 action films
Indian action films
Films scored by D. Imman
Indian police films
2021 direct-to-video films
Indian direct-to-video films
Disney+ Hotstar original films
2020s Tamil-language films